Hipsway are a Scottish pop/new wave band.

History and description
The band was formed in Glasgow in 1984 by ex-Altered Images guitarist Johnny McElhone on bass, and featuring Grahame Skinner (vocals), Pim Jones (guitar) and Harry Travers (drums). Skinner and Travers had been members of the band Kites with Paul McGrath and Ian McGreevy before Hipsway formed.  Their music was characterized by Skinner's deep vocals and Jones' rhythmic guitar style.  They were quickly signed up by Mercury Records and by 1985 had released their first, eponymously titled album.  The album was a moderate success on the UK Albums Chart; while the single "The Honeythief", made number 17 on the UK Singles Chart, and also reached the top 20 on the U.S. Billboard Hot 100 chart.  Another song from the album, "Tinder", became well known in Scotland as the soundtrack to a McEwan's Lager commercial.

However the band failed to build on its success; McElhone founded Texas, and by the time the second album Scratch the Surface was recorded, Travers had also left (to be replaced by Stephen Ferrera).  Released in 1989, the album was not as critically or commercially successful as its predecessor, and the band split up shortly afterwards.

Skinner and Jones subsequently went on to found the band Witness, releasing the album House Called Love (A&M), before Skinner joined former members of Glasgow peers Love and Money in the band, Cowboy Mouth. Pim Jones later formed Big Yoga Muffin with Ange Dolittle, formerly of Eat, releasing one album, Wherever You Go, There You Are (2000, The Echo Label).

In 2011, Grahame Skinner formed the band Skinner with Douglas MacIntyre (Love & Money, Cowboy Mouth and Sugartown), Gordon Wilson (Love & Money and Cowboy Mouth) and Andy Alston (Del Amitri).

In November 2016, Hipsway reformed, playing at Summerhall, Edinburgh then two dates at Glasgow O2 ABC, in support of the 30th anniversary deluxe reissue of their first album. As a result of the positive reception to the re-issue and the 2016 shows, the band played a limited number of gigs in 2017 and 2018, including sell-out shows at the reopened Glasgow Kelvingrove Bandstand and the Barrowlands Ballroom.

Hipsway's first album for almost 30 years, Smoke & Dreams, was released in late 2018.

Post-reformation touring/recording band members have included Jim McDermott (drums), Gary Houston (bass), Stevie Christie (keyboards), Andy May (keyboards), Andy Gillespie (keyboards), David Robertson (percussion) and Louise Murphy (vocals).

Discography

Albums

Singles

References

External links 
 Official website

Musical groups established in 1984
Musical groups disestablished in 1989
Musical groups from Glasgow
Scottish new wave musical groups
Scottish pop music groups